ENA Channel is a regional TV channel, based in Kavala. It covers all of Eastern Macedonia and Thrace, Limnos and Chalkidiki. It was founded in 1991 to help the development of private television. The channel is aimed at informing the public of Eastern Macedonia and Thrace for the corresponding issues Eastern Macedonia and Thrace with three newscasts a day. Apart from informative programs, it has entertainment shows and various other emissions.

Property
The channel is owned by Kavala Radio and Television S.A. and has the same operation legalization protocol by the Greek National Council for Radio and Television with Television of Macedonia and Thrace S.A. which operates Center TV (6447/E/20.3.1998).

The channel is half owned by Bill Koukoutinis and Lefteris Koukoutinis, each holding 50% of the shares. The first is one of the founders of the local radio station of the same name called Radio ENA 90.5 FM which has been operating since September 1989, while since 2007 it has been collaborating with the also local Athenian radio station called Real FM 97.8 owned by Nikos Hadjinikolaou to rebroadcast his program in Kavala.

Programmes
Although ENA syndicates show from various other sources, its-in house production company "Videotex" produces the following shows:

External links

Greek-language television stations
Television channels and stations established in 1991
Television channels in Greece
1991 establishments in Greece